Inge Minor (born 26 November 1929) was a German former figure skater. She competed in the pairs event at the 1952 Winter Olympics.

References

External links
 

1929 births
Possibly living people
German female pair skaters
Olympic figure skaters of Germany
Figure skaters at the 1952 Winter Olympics
Sportspeople from Cologne